Nocturne in Black is a 2016 short film written and directed by Jimmy Keyrouz. The film premiered at Telluride Film Festival and won the gold medal at the Student Academy Awards, the Bafta Student Film Awards, the Directors Guild of America Student Film Awards. The BBC has described it as an "immaculately shot, high-energy short drama".

Plot
In a war-ravaged Middle Eastern neighborhood where daily activities such as smoking tobacco, modern dressing, and music have been banned, Karim, a musician, struggles to rebuild his piano after it is destroyed by Jihadists.

Awards 
Student Academy Awards Gold Medal Winner (2017)
DGA Student Film Awards (2017)
Oscars Shortlist For Live Action Shorts (2017)
Telluride Film Festival Student Prints (2017)
CUFF Faculty Selects (2017)
NBR Marion Carter Green Award Winner (2017)
IFP Independent Filmmaker Project Audience Award
NBR Student Grant Winner (2017)

References

External links

2016 short films